The bullhead minnow ('Pimephales vigilax) is a species of freshwater demersal fish, native to the southern United States.

History
The bullhead minnow was first described by Spencer Baird and Charles Girard in 1853.

Characteristics
The bullhead minnow is cylindrical and small in size, with an average length of 5.7 cm and a maximum length of 9.2 cm. The males of the species are dark in color, brown, olive, or tan, with two light colored vertical lines down their side, while the females are plain in comparison. The snout is rounded, and no teeth are present. The tail is forked with rounded ends, the single dorsal fin contains eight rays and no spine, the anal fin contains seven rays with no spine, pelvic fins are abdominal and no adipose fin is present.

Distribution
The bullhead minnow is mainly located in the southern United States, in the Gulf Coast of the United States and Mississippi River Basin. It can be found in less majority throughout the entire Mississippi River, as well as connected brooks, streams, ponds, lakes, and rivers. They are found more often in waters that typically have little to no movement, such as in river pools. It is one of the 324 fish species found in Tennessee. They have been introduced Osage River and Kansas River systems in Kansas, to the Missouri in Nebraska, the Rio Grande in New Mexico, Lake St Marys in Ohio, the James drainage in South Dakota, the Red River, Canadian River and Rio Grande in Texas and to the upper Fox River and possibly the Menomonee River in Wisconsin. They were probably introduced to these areas as bait fish carried by anglers. It has also been introduced to Utah where it occurs in two closed drainages within the Great Basin, that of the Sevier River and of Lake Utah, it seems to have been introduced here accidentally in releases of channel catfish  (Ictalurus punctatus'') imported from Texas in the 1950s.

Biology 
The spawning season extends from the middle of May through early September. They reproduce in an egg-clustering fashion. For a mating location, the males build a nest, normally protected by rocks, tree roots or limbs, or boards, The female lays eggs in the nest, and the male guards the eggs throughout spawning. There is currently no known age of maturation for this fish. They live an average of three to five years. They are a bottom-living species, and feed on organisms found in the mud covering the ground.

References

Pimephales
Freshwater fish of the United States
Fish described in 1853
Taxa named by Spencer Fullerton Baird